Mannlicher may refer to:

 Ferdinand Mannlicher (1848–1904), Austrian engineer and small arms designer
 List of firearms named after Ferdinand Mannlicher 
 Steyr Arms, formerly Steyr Mannlicher AG, an Austrian firearms manufacturer

See also